Lena Hentschel (born 17 June 2001) is a German diver.

She won a silver medal in the 3 m synchro springboard competition at the 2018 European Aquatics Championships.

She finished in 21st place in the preliminary round in the women's 1 metre springboard event at the 2019 World Aquatics Championships held in Gwangju, South Korea. In the women's 3 metre springboard event she finished in 32nd place in the preliminary round.

References

2001 births
Living people
German female divers
Medalists at the 2020 Summer Olympics
Olympic medalists in diving
Divers at the 2020 Summer Olympics
Olympic bronze medalists for Germany
Olympic divers of Germany
21st-century German women
Divers from Dresden